Pozm-e Tiab (also Romanized as Pozm-e Tīāb, Pazm Tīāb, Pazm Tīyāb, Pozm-e Teyāb, and Pozm Teyāb; also known as Pozm, Pazm, Pūzīm, and Pūzm) is a village in Jahliyan Rural District, in the Central District of Konarak County, Sistan and Baluchestan Province, Iran. At the 2006 census, its population was 2,040, in 402 families.

References 

Populated places in Konarak County